United Agricultural Services Laboratories, commonly referred to as UAS Laboratories, is a private biotechnology company headquartered in Wausau, Wisconsin, USA. It formulates and markets probiotics for both domestic and international markets. Probiotic fermentation is done at their facility located in Madison, Wisconsin and formulation, manufacturing and distribution is done at their facility in Wausau, Wisconsin.

History

UAS Laboratories was founded in 1979 by Dr. S.K. Dash, who had previously served as the Director of the South Dakota Food and Drug. UAS Laboratories was headquartered in Edina, Minnesota, USA. The company decided to base its DDS Probiotics products on Lactobacillus acidophilus DDS-1, a strain of probiotic bacteria that was patented and trademarked. L. acidophilus has been one of the most common strains used in probiotics research.  Under the direction of Dr. S.K. Dash, UAS Laboratories expanded its production capacity and tripled its probiotic manufacturing capacity in 2012. In April 2013 UAS Laboratories was acquired by Lakeview Equity Partners. In January 2014, the company moved their sales and marketing office to Madison, WI.

References

External links
 Company website

Biotechnology companies of the United States
Companies based in Wisconsin
Biotechnology companies established in 1979
1979 establishments in Wisconsin